Vilamovians are a Germanic-speaking ethnic group in Poland, living in the town of Wilamowice near Bielsko-Biała, who speak the Wymysorys language and maintain their own folk costumes and traditions.

History

During the Mongol invasion of Europe, the area was left depopulated and was subsequently settled by German, Scottish and Flemish settlers. Over time the colonists were assimilated, with the exception of Wilamowice. Vilamovians' traditions say they are descendants of immigrants from Flanders.

After World War II, Vilamovians were harshly persecuted in Communist Poland, since they were regarded as Germans. Their language and costumes were banned in 1946. Some of them were moved to "Recovered Territories". A considerable number of representatives of this group live in Austria.

 about 300 people in the community could understand the Wymysorys language and approximately 60 people had the ability to speak it.

Notable Vilamovians
 Józef Bilczewski
 Florian Biesik
 Józef Gara
 Jan Gawiński

See also 
 Ethnic minorities in Poland

Notes

References

Further reading
 Bazielich, Barbara. Strój wilamowicki (Atlas polskich strojów ludowych. Cz. 5, Małopolska ; Z. 15), Wrocław: Polskie Towarzystwo Ludoznawcze, 2001, 
Adam Kleczkowski, Dialekt Wilamowic w Zachodniej Galicji. Fonetyka i Fleksja, 1920 (Google Books, full text) - The introduction includes historical and ethnographical information

External links
Stowarzyszenie na rzecz Zachowania Dziedzictwa Kulturowego Miasta Wilamowice "Wilamowianie" 
Ynzer łidła – nasze pieśni (Ynzer Łidła – Our Songs). Songs, Lullabies and Counting-out Rhymes from Wilamowice

Dutch diaspora in Europe
Ethnic groups in Poland